Asheboro City Schools is located in Asheboro, North Carolina, United States.

District information
 4,485 students
 620 staff 
 Five elementary schools 
 Two middle schools 
 One high school 
 One additional site that houses the Early Childhood Development Center as well as an alternative school program called The Learning Center

Student demographics
 White  30.1% 
 Black  14.2% 
 Hispanic  48.8% 
 Asian    1.6%  
 Multi-racial    5.1%  
 American Indian  Less than 1%

Member schools
 Asheboro High School
 South Asheboro Middle School
 North Asheboro Middle School
 Guy B. Teachey Elementary School
 Lindley Park Elementary School
 Charles W. McCrary Elementary School
 Donna Lee Loflin Elementary School
 Balfour Elementary School

Central office administration and staff
Sandra Spivey, Finance Officer
Ed Keller, Director of Facilities and Maintenance
 Dr. Drew Maerz, Director of Testing and Accountability
 Dr. Cayce McCamish, Director of Exceptional Child Services
 Carla L. Freemyer, Executive Director of Human Resources
 Jordi Roman, Director of Elementary Curriculum
 Anthony Woodyard, Director of Technology and Innovation
 Robin Harris, Director of Federal Programs and EL
 D.R. Cash, Director of Support Services
 Leigh Anna Marbert, Public Information Officer

Board of education
 Gidget Kidd, Board Chair
 Phillip R. Cheek, Board Vice Chair
 Gustavo Agudelo, Finance Committee Chair
 Linda Cranford, Policy Committee Chair
 Baxter Hammer
 Ryan Patton
 Dr. Beth Knott
 Gwen Williams
 Archie Priest, Jr. 
 Michael B. Smith

References

External links

Asheboro, North Carolina
Education in Randolph County, North Carolina
School districts in North Carolina
1905 establishments in North Carolina
School districts established in 1905